Electric Eye is the second studio album by the Christian rock band Prodigal, released in 1984.

The band created promotional music videos for "Scene of the Crime", "Fast Forward", and "Boxes", which were featured on Trinity Broadcasting Network's music video show Real Videos at the time of the album's release.

In a 2009 interview, frontman Loyd Boldman said "we put a 'stop-groove' at the end of Side Two that would 'catch' the vinyl record and wouldn't allow it to eject on an automatic turntable. If you picked up the needle and set it down again on the other side of the stop-groove, you’d hear a packet of computer code that could be deciphered by a Commodore 64, the most popular computer of that time. If you used a cassette drive, the Commodore would show you lyrics and graphics and some facts about the album." In 2019, it was demonstrated that the contents were a short BASIC program displaying a quote by Albert Einstein and a quote by Jesus.

Track listing

"Boxes" fades into a verse of the early 20th-century hymn "Turn Your Eyes Upon Jesus", sung by producer Jon Phelps. This track is listed on the inner sleeve but not on the record label or album jacket.

Band members
Loyd Boldman: Keyboards, vocals
Dave Workman: Drums, vocals
Rick Fields: Guitars, saxophones, vocals
Mike Wilson: Bass guitar

Production
Producer: Jon Phelps
Recording engineer: Greg McNeily:
Engineers: Rytt Hershburg, Brad Kuenning, Paul Thompson
Mixer: Gary Platt
Mastering: Mike Fuller

References 

1984 albums
Prodigal (band) albums